Devon Avenue  is a major east-west street in the Chicago metropolitan area.  It begins at Chicago's Sheridan Road, which borders Lake Michigan, and it runs west until merging with Higgins Road near O'Hare International Airport.  Devon continues on the opposite side of the airport and runs intermittently through Chicago's northwestern suburbs. In the northwest suburbs west of O'Hare Airport, Devon Avenue is the boundary between Cook and DuPage counties. The street is located at 6400 N in Chicago's address system.

History

Devon Avenue was originally known as Church Road, but it was renamed in the 1880s by Edgewater developer John Lewis Cochran after Devon station on the Main Line north of Philadelphia. The street has been settled by many Asian immigrant groups, which is perhaps most evident between Kedzie and Ridge Avenues in West Ridge, Chicago. Here, one will encounter concentrations of Jewish Americans, Assyrian Americans, Russian Americans, Indian Americans, Pakistani Americans, Bangladeshi Americans, and Pashtun Americans. Portions of Devon in this area have been renamed in honor of Golda Meir, Mahatma Gandhi, Muhammad Ali Jinnah, and Sheikh Mujibur Rahman.

The organization "Friends of Refugees of Eastern Europe" (better known as "F.R.E.E. of Chicago") is headquartered in the Orthodox-Jewish section of Devon. As a result, most Soviet/CIS immigrants of Jewish ancestry settled around this area upon arrival in Chicago. After acclimation, these residents would tend to move to the north suburbs (especially Skokie and Buffalo Grove). Because the vast majority of the Jewish diaspora residing in the former Soviet Union have emigrated since its collapse, the vibrancy of this particular area of Devon is not as apparent as it was in the 1970s, 1980s, and early 1990s (which were periods of mass emigration). Nevertheless, a significant proportion of these immigrants, especially the elderly, have remained on Devon.

Devon's Desi corridor is one of the best-known and largest communities of its kind in North America.  It exists mainly on Devon between Ravenswood Ave. and California Ave.  South Asian shops, restaurants and grocery stores including the first location of Patel Brothers, that opened in 1974, abound along this strip, and it has become a popular tourist destination.  Vivek Mukherjee of Rediff.com writes, "There are similar desi markets in New Jersey, at the famous Oak Tree Road or in the Bay Area, but nothing like Devon Street. [...] Devon Street's sidewalks are even speckled with the paan stains".

Other points of interest along Devon Avenue include Superdawg, Loyola University Chicago, DePaul University's O'Hare Campus, Bryn Mawr Country Club, Hanna Sacks Bais Yaakov High School, Edgebrook Golf Course, Thillens Stadium, Novelty Par Mini Golf Course, parts of the Forest Preserve and Misericordia/Heart of Mercy, serving children with developmental disabilities.

Transportation
Devon Avenue is served by the 155 Devon between Sheridan Road and Kedzie Avenue. The 36 Broadway, 88 Higgins and 151 Sheridan serve the street for shorter segments.

Notes

External links
A Walk Down Devon Avenue

Asian-American culture in Chicago
Bangladeshi-American culture
Ethnic enclaves in Illinois
Indian-American culture in Illinois
Jews and Judaism in Chicago
Little Indias
Little Pakistans
Neighborhoods in Chicago
Orthodox Jewish communities
Pakistani-American culture
South Asian American culture
Streets in Chicago